Television frequency allocation has evolved since the start of television in Australia in 1956, and later in New Zealand in 1960. There was no coordination between the national spectrum management authorities in either country to establish the frequency allocations. The management of the spectrum in both countries is largely the product of their economical and political situation. New Zealand didn't start to develop television service until 1965 due to World War 2 and its economic harm in the country's economy.

The demand and planning for television in Australia intensified after WW2, with the Chifley government first favouring the existing British model (state monopoly) in 1948, and New Zealand used a similar model during the introduction of television in the 1960s. Private broadcasting did not come to the country until the 1980s, but there was no spectrum expansion to cope with the new arrangement.

History

Australia 
Australian television broadcasting commenced in 1956 in Melbourne and Sydney to coincide with the 1956 Summer Olympics.

Three stations commenced operations on a ten channel spectrum arrangement: the ABC operating in the VHF low band (VHF Ch 2), and the commercial stations operating in the VHF high band (VHF Ch 7 & 9). At the outset, commercial stations were independently owned, but due to economic forces network affiliations were soon established.

This pattern of television spectrum allocation was replicated in most of the state capital cities over the subsequent decade, with the exception of Hobart (one commercial service on VHF 6) and eventually Darwin (both the ABC and the commercial service were allocated in the VHF high band).

Geographical conditions differed in Melbourne and Sydney. The Melbourne transmission towers were located on the nearby Mount Dandenong, and their elevation and broadcasting power on an otherwise relatively flat terrain meant that the broadcasting signal could be received for some considerable distance, although there were some areas that experienced reception difficulties due to hills or buildings.

In the Sydney "basin" (formed by the Blue Mountains) the broadcast towers were collocated on the original studio sites, and given the undulating geography of Sydney there were many areas that experienced reception difficulties. The Blue Mountain terrain in the West of Sydney meant that capital city broadcasting did not penetrate into the hinterland of NSW, unlike that of Melbourne. It is possible that the penetration of weak signals into the Victorian hinterlands hastened the demand for the establishment of regional television stations, which commenced in 1961.

The Australian Government restricted regional television broadcasting to one commercial service and a repeater station of the national broadcaster from the capital city ABC station. Regional television stations tended to be allocated to VHF 6, 8 or in some cases 10.

FM allocation artifacts 
The United Kingdom and New Zealand until recently shared an FM broadcasting allocation of 88.0 MHz to 105.0 MHz. Since the early 2000s both nations have full use of the standard FM band due to reallocation activities related to their separate implementation strategies for digital television.

This smaller FM Band allocation (less than 20 MHz: 88 MHz to 108 MHz as is used in most countries) can be traced to the 405-line television system's VHF allocation block. The UK adopted the 405-line system but NZ did not. The slightly smaller allocation only posed problems for the UK for its densely populated metropolitan regions, but NZ had few problems with the smaller allocation.

NZ's allocation for FM remained smaller as if NZ had adopted the 405-line system. New Zealand considered adopting the 405-line system in the late 1950s to early 1960s but adopted PAL instead. This impacted the frequency allocation block for FM broadcasting making it smaller. New Zealand's FM frequency allocation issue was not fixed until the late 1990s, when the FM band was expanded to the standard full 20 MHz block. As of the mid-2010s NZ totally abandoned its VHF band for UHF channels above 25.

Differences in frequencies 
There is a frequency offset for many DTV channels between Australia and NZ, because of historical reasons relating to the introduction of PAL.

 Both Australia and New Zealand use 7 MHz channel spacing (for PAL B) on VHF, but the frequencies and channel numbers differ substantially because of Australia revising its VHF TV band usage.
 Australia adopted Zweiton for stereophonic audio broadcasting, whilst NZ adopted NICAM.
 For PAL, the only difference is the placement of the NICAM carrier vs the Zweiton carrier, for broadcasters using NICAM. NZ used 5.824 MHz NICAM carrier offset, as used in mainland Europe. 
 Australia's Zweiton offset was not changed with respect to the European standard.
 Australia, New Zealand, Fiji and Papua New Guinea have the same UHF band allocation for TV broadcasting.

Obsolete channels
 With the introduction of digital terrestrial television in Australia in 2001, channels 10 and 11 were moved up by 1 MHz.
 This allocation change allowed a full 7 MHz for a new channel (9A).
 VHF channel 12 was added following the new channel 11 to compensate for the change.
 channels 0-2 and 5A ceased to be used for television when analogue television broadcasting was discontinued.
 Television broadcasts on channels 3, 4, and 5 were previously discontinued in most regional areas in 1991 and 1992. Since the frequencies for these channels overlapped the range used for FM radio, any television broadcasts on these channels prevented the allocation of new FM radio licences, predominantly in regional areas.
 VHF Low Band DX using ITU TV Band (I) and part of Band (III) from NZ may disappear with the transition to DVB-T.

Frequency allocation table
DVB-T channel allocation notes:

 The allocation for terrestrial television must be seen in terms of uniform system G 8 MHz blocks (for bands IV and V in NZ) and system B 7 MHz blocks (for bands I to V in Australia) after the cessation of analogue television.
 DVB-T,  analogue systems B and G utilize the same 250 kHz guard-band.
 After analogue television transmissions have ceased, only the preferred main carrier wave centre frequency should be listed, because QAM modulates all AV channels and other data into a single H.222 data stream.
 Digital services on channels above Ch 51 are going to change channel after the analog services are switched off. The ACMA has published the pre-stack and post-stack channel in a spreadsheet on its website.
 Australian channel 12 was discontinued decades ago but is being reintroduced with digital television, generally for the ABC in the major metropolitan areas.
 A common problem (for metropolitan areas in particular) of difficulty receiving digital 10 (on channel 11) and digital ABC (on channel 12) is because older antennas were not designed to receive channels 11 and 12. Many VHF Band III antennas were only designed to receive channels 6 to 10 for analog television transmissions.
 Australia and New Zealand analog sub-carriers use the standard B/G offsets from the vision carrier.
 PAL color difference at +4.43361875 MHz
 FM monaural full mixed down channel audio at +5.5 MHz
 New Zealand (B/G version) NICAM stereo or dual monaural at +5.824 MHz
 Australian A2 Stereo right or second monaural channel at +5.742 MHz (AM signalling at +5.46875 MHz)

DTT allocation 

NOTE: Text in italics means these frequencies are not currently used but set aside as a Guardband or for future use.

Very high frequency

UHF 

External Data is from ACMA Register of Radiocommunications Licences -

Australian frequencies

Channels according to State 

 The external territories include the Cocos Islands, Christmas Island & the Bayu-Undan Gas Project in the Timor Sea.

State-owned stations

The ABC has the highest number of transmission sites: often, but not always, SBS and ABC signals are transmitted from the same masts.

Private networks

Some commercial broadcasters have a call sign that operates over multiple areas, whereas others may only serve a single area.  This is due to historical ownership of regional stations. Nevertheless, most regional stations are now affiliated with the major metropolitan networks.

New Zealand frequencies 

Channel 25 is being used as a Guardband, but could be used if a channel reallocation be needed.

See also
 Television channel frequencies
 North American broadcast television frequencies
 North American cable television frequencies
 Ultra high frequency
 Very high frequency
 Moving image formats
 Broadcast television systems
 ATSC (standards)
 Multichannel television sound
 NTSC
 NTSC-J
 PAL
 RCA
 SECAM

References

External links
New Zealand
 VHF & UHF Frequency user databases
 New Zealand TV Channels
 Radio Spectrum Usage in New Zealand
 Current TV Bandplan

Australia
 Digital TV Switchover Australia
 PDF extracts of the license holder database
 VHF DTV Channel Embargo
 Radio and television broadcasting stations
 Digital TV Channels
 TV Channels - Freeview [Broken Link]
 A comprehensive list of digital tv transmitter locations and frequencies

Lists of television channels by region
Frequencies
Frequencies